Rotheca myricoides (butterfly bush – also a name for Buddleja species) is a species of flowering plant in the family Lamiaceae. It is native to Africa and widely cultivated elsewhere. In cultivation, it is frequently known by one of its synonyms, such as Clerodendrum myricoides.

Each flower has a darker blue lower petal. The altitude range for this species is 900–1680 m. It has won the Royal Horticultural Society's Award of Garden Merit.

Distribution 
Rotheca myricoides is native to mountains from Eritrea to South Africa. It is native to Angola, Botswana, Burundi, Caprivi Strip, Democratic Republic of the Congo, Djibouti, Eswatini, Eritrea, Ethiopia, Kenya, KwaZulu-Natal, Malawi, Mozambique, Namibia, Northern Provinces, Rwanda, Somalia, Sudan, Tanzania, Uganda, Zambia, Zimbabwe. It was introduced to Trinidad-Tobago, Australia, Brazil.

Habitat 
This species may be found in rocky places, streams and edges of the evergreen forest.

Etymology 
The Genus name, Rotheca, seemingly comes from the Malaysian words "cheriga" which means small and "thekku" which means teak. The species epithet comes form a French word "myriades" which means ten thousand and a Latinization of a Greek "oides" which means to see. Some say that the species epithet came about because it resembles another species in Myrica so the name refers to the leaf shape.

'Ugandense' is a cultivar of this species which shows purplish-blue flowers with flashy stamens. Originally named Clerodendrum myricoides 'Ugandense' but a 1998 study let to its current status as Rotheca myricoides 'Ugandense".

Morphology

Flowers 
The flowers are arranged in dichasial cymes and are sometimes arranged in short-pedunculate panicles. The stamens and styles are long-exserted and curve upwards. The corolla is asymmetrical in the bud and they have a mid-lobe dark blue or violet blue while the lateral lobes are pale blue or mauve. The calyx is bud-shaped  with a tube of 5mm long and the lobes rounded to triangular.

Lots of variation in the flower colour. It can be green and blue or mauve, white and blue, or blue to mauve.

Fruits 
The fruits of this species are 5-6 by 8–10 mm in dimension and are mostly deeply 4-lobed.

Leaves 
The leaf outline is mostly ovate to rhomboid. The outline can sometimes be elliptic or obovate. The leaf margin is dentate or deeply lobed. The indumentum of the leaves can be variable. There is often a hairy upper surface and can be sparsely to densely hairy on the lower surface. It has been described to feel velvety. When the leaves are crushed, there is an unpleasant scent. This may be due to the pelate hairs or pelate glands on the leaves. The leaves are opposite are whorls of 3–4. The petiole is 0–24 mm long.

Branches 
The young branches are normally angular, pale greyish-whitish and using with white lenticels. They are hairy, mostly at the growth points. The arrangement of the main branches are normally opposite. There are prominent leaf scars on the branches as well. The branches can be 4-angled and brownish-red towards the apex. The lateral branches are short, leafy and flowering.

Medicinal Uses

Traditional 
Rotheca myricoides is used in traditional medicine to manage diabetes in lower eastern part of Kenya. This area constitutes mostly by the Kamba community. They take this medicine daily by boiling the leaves. This species is also used to treat epilepsy, arthritis, typhoid, cough, eye problems, tonsillitis, rheumatism, gonorrhoea, cancer, malaria, dysmenorrhea, sterility, impotence.

In traditional medicine, European and African people used the bark of the species in its powdered form, and a teaspoon is used to treat snakebites. The Masai used the root bark for East Coast fever in cattle and diarrhea in their calves. The Haya and Shambala used Rotheca myricoides for dysmenorrhoea and cough, furunculosis and swellings that are associated with debility. The root of the plant is also used for chest pain, colds, gum bleeding and indigestion. In Zimbabwe, it is used for headaches, bathing people with convulsions. In West Africa, the plant is used for analgesic and antipyretic purposes.

In Asian countries, this species has been brewed as a tea to relieve swelling and pain.

Recent Studies 
A 2019 study looked at freeze-dried extracts of the Rotheca myricoides and found that they possess significant anti-hyperglycemic and antidyslipidemic effects on a type 2 diabetes rat model. The antidyslipidemic effects included decreased total plasma cholesterol, LDL-cholesterol, serum triglyceride and increased HDL-cholesterol. The freeze-dried extracts also lowered the serum uric levels and hepatic triglycerides and hepatic weight. This study confirms the effectiveness of the traditional medicine to manage diabetes in Kenya. The mechanism for the antidiabetic effects is due to the modulation of PPAR-γ.

A 2008 study found that Rotheca myricoides had antimutagenic properties. The leaf extract of the species and DCM and MeOH extracts shows clear anti-mutagenicity. The antimutagenic properties were seen even at low doses of 0.05 mg/L.

Rotheca myricoides is one ingredient (along with four African medicinal plants: Clerodendrum glabrum E. Mey. Lamiaceae, Gladiolus dalenii van Geel, and Senna occidentalis (L.) Link) in a new COVID-19 therapeutic candidate called PHELA. In vitro testing found that PHELA inhibited >90% of SARS-CoV-2 and SARS-CoV infection at concentration levels of 0.005 mg/mL to 0.03 mg/mL.  They also found that PHELA had very strong binding energy interactions with SARS-CoV-2 proteins.

Ecology 
The Rotheca myricoides interacts with several other species. Pseumenes depressus, the Asian Hornet, and Xylocopa ruficeps all visit the Rotheca myricoides. Xylocopa phalothorax, Xylocopa tranquebarorum, Xylocopa nasalis eat the Rotheca myricoides.

The status on the Red List of South African plants is at "Least Concern" as assessed on 2005/06/30 as it was not highlighted as a potential taxa for conservation concern.

References

External links
 

Flora of Africa
Lamiaceae